Honeymoon for Three is a 1941 romantic comedy film directed by Lloyd Bacon. It is a remake of the 1933 film Goodbye Again.

Plot
An author in love with his secretary gets into trouble when he encounters an infatuated fan.

Cast
 Ann Sheridan as Anne Rogers. Sheridan and Brent married in 1942 and divorced the following year.
 George Brent as Kenneth Bixby
 Charlie Ruggles as Harvey Wilson
 Osa Massen as Julie Wilson
 Jane Wyman as Elizabeth Clochessy
 William T. Orr as Arthur Westlake
 Lee Patrick as Mrs. Pettijohn
 Walter Catlett as Waiter
 Herbert Anderson as Floyd Ingram
 Johnny Downs as Chester T. Farrington III

Reception
Bosley Crowther gave a negative review in The New York Times: "When we take Mr. Brent as a Don Juan, the picture has got to be funnier than the main premise, for Mr. Brent, as is generally known, is somewhat remote from the type. And that funny, we regret to say, 'Honeymoon for Three' is not."

References

External links
 
 
 
 

American romantic comedy films
American black-and-white films
American films based on plays
Films directed by Lloyd Bacon
Warner Bros. films
Films scored by Heinz Roemheld
1941 romantic comedy films
1941 films
1940s American films